William Francis Conolly-Carew, 6th Baron Carew, CBE, C.St.J (23 April 1905 – 27 June 1994), was Aide-de-Camp to the Governor of Bermuda, Sir Thomas Astley-Cubbitt, between 1931 and 1936.

Born William Francis Carew, he assumed the additional surname of Conolly by deed poll in 1938.  He was the son of The 5th Baron Carew and Catherine Conolly, daughter of Thomas Conolly, MP, of Castletown, Celbridge, County Kildare. Upon the death of his father in 1927 he inherited the title of Baron Carew in the Peerage of the United Kingdom (cr. 1838) and also in the Peerage of Ireland (cr.1834).

Lord Carew was educated at Wellington College and the Royal Military College, Sandhurst. He was gazetted into the Duke of Cornwall's Light Infantry in 1925 and served during the Second World War as a captain, reaching the brevet rank of major.

He was appointed a Commander of the Order of the British Empire in 1966 and was also a Companion of the Order of St. John.

In 1937, Carew married Lady Sylvia Gwendoline Eva Maitland (1913–1991), a daughter of the 15th Earl of Lauderdale and Ethel Mary Bell-Irving.  They had issue:

Patrick Thomas Conolly-Carew, 7th Baron Carew (born 1938)
 Diana Sylvia (born 1940)
Gerald Maitland-Carew (born 1941)
 Sarah Catherine (born 1944)

Notes

References
 Who's Who, London: Black, 1945, p. 439.
Kidd, Charles & Williamson, David (eds.) (1990) Debrett's Peerage and Baronetage (1990 edition). New York: St Martin's Press, 

1905 births
1994 deaths
Duke of Cornwall's Light Infantry officers
British Army personnel of World War II
Commanders of the Order of the British Empire
Commanders of the Order of St John
People educated at Wellington College, Berkshire
Graduates of the Royal Military College, Sandhurst
William
Eldest sons of British hereditary barons